Divisions are the first-level administrative divisions in Bangladesh. As of 2023, there are eight divisions of Bangladesh, each named after the major city within its jurisdiction that also serves as the administrative seat of that division. Each division is divided into several districts which are further subdivided into upazilas, then union councils.

History
Following the independence of Bangladesh in 1971, the country had four divisions: Chittagong Division, Dacca Division, Khulna Division, and Rajshahi Division. In 1982, the English spelling of the Dacca Division (along with the name of the capital city) was changed into Dhaka Division to more closely match the Bengali pronunciation.

In 1993, Barisal Division was split off from Khulna Division, and in 1995, Sylhet Division was split off from Chittagong Division. On 25 January 2010, Rangpur Division was split off from Rajshahi Division. On 14 September 2015, Mymensingh Division was split off from Dhaka Division and added as the eighth division. In 2015, the process started to create two more divisions: Comilla Division and Faridpur Division. In October 2021, Prime Minister Sheikh Hasina announced the formation of two new divisions, Meghna and Padma, named after the eponymous rivers, in the places of Comilla and Faridpur Divisions.

Divisional Commissioner
Divisional Commissioner is the administrative head of a division. Divisional Commissioner is appointed by the government from an Additional Secretary level officer of Bangladesh Civil Service (B.C.S.) Administration Cadre. The role of a Divisional Commissioner's office is to act as the supervisory head of all the government offices (except the central government offices) situated in the division. A Divisional Commissioner is given the direct responsibility of supervising the revenue and development administration of a division. The Divisional Commissioner is assisted by the several Additional Divisional Commissioners, Senior Assistant Commissioners and other bureaucratic officials.

List of divisions
The following table outlines some key statistics about the eight divisions of Bangladesh as found in the 2011 Population and Housing Census conducted by the Bangladesh Bureau of Statistics (B.B.S.).

Proposed divisions
Two more divisions have been proposed to ease down administrative work load due to increase in population:

 Meghna Division – proposed to consist of the six northern districts of the current Chittagong Division: Brahmanbaria, Chandpur, Comilla, Feni,  Laxmipur, and Noakhali.
 Padma Division – proposed to consist of Faridpur, Gopalganj, Madaripur, Rajbari, and Shariatpur districts.
Their formation has been confirmed in October 2021 by the Prime Minister Sheikh Hasina.

See also
 ISO 3166 codes
 List of regions of Bangladesh by Human Development Index
 Districts of Bangladesh
 Upazilas of Bangladesh
 Union councils of Bangladesh
 Villages of Bangladesh

References

 
Subdivisions of Bangladesh
Divisions
Bangladesh 1
Divisions, Bangladesh
Bangladesh geography-related lists